Rick Hillis was a Canadian poet and short story writer.

Life
He graduated from the University of Saskatchewan and the Iowa Writers Workshop, with an MFA.  He attended Stanford University as a Stegner Fellow and Jones Lecturer in fiction writing, and was also a Chesterfield Film Writers’ Fellow at Universal Studios.

He taught creative writing at a number of institutions, including Reed College, Stanford University, Lewis & Clark College, and the University of Oregon. As well, he was on faculty at the University of Iowa’s Summer Writers’ Festival. He began teaching at DePauw University in 2002.

Awards
 1990 Drue Heinz Literature Prize, for Limbo River
 Gerald Lampert Award finalist

Works

Short stories

Poetry

Death
Rick Hillis died on October 6, 2014.

References

Year of birth missing (living people)
Living people
20th-century Canadian poets
Canadian male poets
Canadian male short story writers
Reed College faculty
Lewis & Clark College faculty
DePauw University faculty
Iowa Writers' Workshop alumni
Stegner Fellows
University of Oregon faculty
20th-century Canadian short story writers
20th-century Canadian male writers